Kurt Svensson (15 April 1927 – 11 July 2016) was a Swedish football forward who represented Sweden at the 1950 FIFA World Cup but did not play. He played his club football for IS Halmia.

References

1927 births
2016 deaths
Swedish footballers
Sweden international footballers
Association football forwards
IS Halmia players
1950 FIFA World Cup players